Hub City or Hub city may refer to:

Travel
 A city used as an airline hub
 Term used to refer to the sites of a bio-secure bubble

Places
Pakistan
 Hub, Balochistan
United States
 Hub City, Wisconsin

Comics
 Hub City (comics), a fictional city from the DC Comics Universe

Nicknames
Canada
 Nanaimo, British Columbia
 Moncton, New Brunswick
 Saskatoon, Saskatchewan
United States
 Phenix City, Alabama
 Compton, California
 Crestview, Florida
Limon, Colorado
 Rochelle, Illinois
 Union City, Indiana
 Oelwein, Iowa
 Lafayette, Louisiana
 Hagerstown, Maryland
 Boston, Massachusetts
 Jordan, Minnesota
 Hattiesburg, Mississippi
 New Brunswick, New Jersey
 Belen, New Mexico
 Spartanburg, South Carolina
 Aberdeen, South Dakota
 Alice, Texas
 Lubbock, Texas
 Mount Pleasant, Utah
 Burlington, Washington
 Pharr, Texas
 Miami, Florida
 Jackson, Tennessee
 Elizabethtown, Kentucky